Restless Knights is a 1935 short subject directed by Charles Lamont starring American slapstick comedy team The Three Stooges (Moe Howard, Larry Fine and Jerry Howard). It is the sixth entry in the series released by Columbia Pictures starring the comedians, who released 190 shorts for the studio between 1934 and 1959.

Plot
Set in medieval times, the father Walter Brennan of the Stooges informs him from his deathbed that they are of royal blood.

Now dubbed the Duke of Durham (Larry), the Count of Fife (Moe) and Baron of Grey Matter (Curly), they are entrusted by their father to take up arms and protect Queen Anne (Geneva Mitchell) of their old kingdom of Anesthesia, as word has spread that the present prime minister, Prince Boris (George Baxter), may attempt to seize the throne. The Stooges accept and make their way to Anesthesia, where, as the Duke of Mixture, the Fife of Drum and Baron of Brains, they become the queen's royal guards. The prince puts in motion his plan to abduct the queen as a royal wrestling match starts. Disgusted by the result of the match, Moe and Curly take it upon themselves to wrestle in their place with Larry acting as the referee. After an unforgettable match, the queen ends up missing, with the Stooges blamed for being lax. A sword fight ensues and the Stooges are taken away to be executed.

The Stooges are sentenced to be shot by crossbows, but before the arrows are fired the archers spot a woman undressing at a window. Enchanted, they watch her, giving the Stooges a chance to escape. As they hide out from the guards someone drops a jug on Curly's head. It contains a note stating that the queen is hidden in the wine cellar. The Stooges head to the cellar, spotting a few of the men who had taken the queen, and come up with a plan—Curly will lure them out one by one, and Moe and Larry will knock them out. The plan goes well until one guard trips while chasing Curly and Moe and Larry inadvertently knock themselves out. Curly takes off with the guard hot on his trail, until Curly sneaks up behind him and knocks him out. He then runs back to the alcove, where Moe and Larry regain consciousness just in time to hear footsteps. Thinking them to be of the guard they missed, they swing their clubs and knock Curly out instead. The queen, tied up and hidden away, is able to loosen the gag on her mouth and call for help. The Stooges rush to her rescue, but a few more guards show up to search the wine cellar for them. Moe instructs Curly to do the same tactic he did before, but as he and Larry take position and Curly dashes past the doorway, the queen follows him, unaware of their plan, and is accidentally knocked out. Once they realize what they have done, all three Stooges hit themselves on the head, knocking each other out.

Production notes
Restless Knights was filmed on December 19–22, 1934. The film title Restless Knights is a pun on "restless nights," or chronic insomnia. Opening theme music was titled "Entry of the Giants," composed by Louis Silvers.

The title Baron of Grey Matter is a pun on "barren of grey matter.

References

External links 
 
 
 Restless Knights at threestooges.net

1935 comedy films
1935 films
1935 short films
American black-and-white films
Arthurian films
Columbia Pictures short films
Fiction set in Roman Britain
Films directed by Charles Lamont
Films set in the 1620s
The Three Stooges films
1930s English-language films
1930s American films